Jules Granier (1770–1821) was a French composer, born in Paris, France. He wrote the Easter song "Hosanna" recorded by the Italian tenor Enrico Caruso. The song Hosanna describes a prayer to God, and is a hymn of praise.

External links
 Sheet music for "Hosanna!", G. Schirmer, 1891.

1770 births
1821 deaths
Musicians from Paris
French composers
French male composers